Robertson House or Robertson Farm may refer to:

Robertson House (Kensett, Arkansas)
Giboney-Robertson-Stewart House, in Wynne, Arkansas
T.H. Robertson House, in Fort Collins, Colorado, listed on the NRHP in Larimer County, Colorado
Kidd-Robertson House, in LaGrange, Georgia, listed on the NRHP in Troup County, Georgia
Robertson House (Eureka, Kansas)
Samuel Robertson House, in Elizabethtown, Kentucky, listed on the NRHP in Hardin County, Kentucky
Robertson House (Hemp Ridge, Kentucky)
Boyle-Robertson-Letcher House, in Lancaster, Kentucky, listed on the NRHP in Garrard County, Kentucky
Robertson Place, in Tyrone, Kentucky, listed on the NRHP in Woodford County, Kentucky
Eugene P. Robertson House, in Albion, Michigan
Robertson-Yates House, in Hernando, Mississippi
Cooke-Robertson House, in Sandusky, Ohio, listed on the NRHP in Erie County, Ohio
Dr. and Mrs. Charles G. Robertson House and Garden, in Salem, Oregon, listed on the NRHP in Marion County, Oregon
Robertson-Easterling-McLaurin House, in Bennettsville, South Carolina
William Robertson House, in Pinopolis, South Carolina
Robertson Family Farm, in Whiteville, Tennessee
Sheeks-Robertson House, in Austin, Texas
Col. Elijah Sterling Clack Robertson Plantation, in Salado, Texas
Judge William J. Robertson House, in Charlottesville, Virginia
John A. and Martha Robertson House, in Lodi, Wisconsin

See also
Roberts House (disambiguation)